John Lionel Golden (June 27, 1874 – June 17, 1955) was an American actor, songwriter, author, and theatrical producer. As a songwriter, he is best-known as lyricist for "Poor Butterfly" (1916). He produced many Broadway shows and four films.

Life

Early years

John L. Golden was born in New York City on June 27, 1874.
He grew up in Wauseon, Ohio and returned to New York when he was fourteen. Golden briefly attended the law school at New York University. He joined a chemical manufacturing firm, where he worked for thirteen years.

Composer

Golden began a career as a lyricist. He composed the music for Miss Prinnt, a musical farce in which his friend Marie Dressler starred, that opened in late 1900 in New York City. It was described by the critic Alan Dale as "a ghastly collection of decayed jokes, taphouse slang, meaningless music and direly trashy story..." He contributed lyrics to The Hoyden, a Charles Dillingham production that ran from October 19, 1907, to February 1, 1908. He wrote the music and lyrics for Florenz Ziegfeld's Over the River (1912). This otherwise mundane show, co-produced by Dillingham, was the first in which ballroom dancing appeared on the legitimate stage. Charles Dillingham hired Golden, now well known as a lyricist, to work on his Hip-Hip-Hooray. It opened at the Hippodrome on September 30, 1915, and ran for 425 performances. The show received excellent reviews. Between 1909 and 1921, R. H. Burnside staged many spectacular shows at the Hippodrome. Golden wrote the lyrics for four of these shows in a row.

While they were working for the Hippodrome shows in 1916, Golden and John Raymond Hubbell were asked to create a Japanese-style song. In Golden's autobiography Stagestruck (1930) he recalls creating Poor Butterfly with Hubbell in the summer of 1916. They went down to the elephant pens in the basement of the Hippodrome to find somewhere cool. Hubbell started to play the melody, and the lyrics quickly came to Golden, despite the presence and smell of the beasts. The song is about the central character in Madame Butterfly and was sung by Haru Onuki in The Big Show, which ran for 425 performances at the Hippodrome from August 13, 1916, to September 1917. Poor Butterfly became a smash hit.

Another popular Golden song was Goodbye, Girls, I’m Through.

Stage producer

With the earnings from his songs Golden moved into producing and staging shows. He always avoided anything risqué. His first show was Turn to the Right (1916). It was a hit, as were eight of his next eleven shows. His second show, Lightnin', ran for three years. Lightnin was co-written by Frank Bacon, who became Golden's partner and co-produced Turn to the Right!. The other writer was Winchell Smith. It was first staged in February 1918. President Woodrow Wilson attended a show with his wife and called Golden to his box, telling him the play was the most entertaining they had ever seen. Lightnin played for 1,291 performances on Broadway, a record at the time. After Lightnin closed the cast paraded down Broadway to Pennsylvania Station, where they boarded a train for a tour of the nation. The parade was headed by Mayor John Francis Hylan and Commissioner Grover Whalen.

Other hits were Three Wise Fools, Seventh Heaven, The First Year and Claudia. Golden staged Guy Bolton's Chicken Feed at the Little Theatre in 1923, playing to good audiences. In 1924 he presented Pigs at the Little, another hit. Golden produced Phoebe and Henry Ephron's Three's a Family in 1943 at the Longacre Theatre, the last play staged there until 1953. Three's a Family (1943–44) was Golden's last hit.

Films
The Saphead (1920), a film starring Buster Keaton, was presented by John L. Golden and Winchell Smith in conjunction with Marcus Loew. It was based on The New Henrietta, a 1913 stage hit for which Golden and Smith had been responsible. In 1925 Golden produced the film Thank You, adapted from a play by Winchell Smith and Tom Cushing, directed by John Ford and starring George O'Brien. The film of Lightnin', adapted from Golden's stage success, appeared on October 31, 1930. In 1932 Golden co-produced the film version of Those We Love, starring Mary Astor, Kenneth MacKenna and Lilyan Tashman.

Theater operator

The first John Golden Theater was designed by Harrison G. Wiseman and opened at 202 W. 58th Street, Manhattan, on November 1, 1926. The first show was Two Girls Wanted, which had been playing at the Little Theatre. It was renamed the 58th Street Theater on September 17, 1935. When Golden lost the 54th Street theater he leased the Royale Theater at 242 W. 45th Street and renamed it the Golden Theater. He operated it from 1934-36. The first production was Norma Krasna's Small Miracle in 1934. The theater struggled during the Depression. In 1936 the Shubert brothers took it and changed the name back to the Royale. They leased it to CBS for use as a radio theater.

In 1937 Golden bought the Masque Theatre, which had been designed in 1927 by Herbert J. Krapp  for Irwin Chanin and his brother Henry I. Chanin. He renamed it the John Golden Theatre, the third theater in New York named after him. The 800-seat venue at 252 W. 45th Street had its first success under the new name with Shadow and Substance (1938) starring Julie Haydon and Sir Cedric Hardwicke. After mixed success, in mid-1946 the theater became a cinema. It returned to stage performances on February 29, 1948, with a one-man show by Maurice Chevalier and continued to stage a variety of plays and other shows into the 2000s.

Other activities

During his long career Golden made a fortune from the theater, and gave much in return as a philanthropist. In World War I and again in World War II he organized a service to provide free tickets to servicemen. He was a founder of the Stage Door Canteen and the Stage Relief Fund. Golden was a charter member of the American Society of Composers, Authors and Publishers (ASCAP), the first treasurer of this organization and director from 1914 to 1915. Golden was one of the first board members of the City Center of Music and Drama.

In 1919 John Golden arranged a meeting with fellow producers Fred Zimmerman, Archibald Selwyn, Florenz Ziegfeld, Jr., Winchell Smith, and L. Lawrence Weber with the goal of cooperating on common issues such as censorship and ticket speculation. He wanted to set up a forum so the producers could share ideas, and wanted to stop the rival organizations from poaching each other's stars. This led to formation of the Producing Managers' Association, which may have inadvertently shown actors the value of organizing into the Actors' Equity Association. Soon after, Equity launched a strike. Golden found himself called a traitor or enemy by actor friends such as Ralph Morgan and DeWolf Hopper. After a month and 37 closed productions and 16 stopped openings, the strike was settled on September 6, 1919. Golden was among the managers at the meeting in the St. Regis Hotel in which the strike was ended. The managers signed a five-year contract in which they recognized Equity and promised better conditions.

Golden was "Shepherd" of the Lambs, a social club for workers in the theatrical professions, from 1942 to 1944. In 1954 he was appointed New York City Chairman for United Nations Day. He was the author of the United Nations All Faith Prayer For Peace.

Family and legacy

Golden married Margaret Hesterich in 1909. They moved to Bayside, Queens in 1920. They bought a 15-room house on a 20-acre estate and gave 9 acres for use as baseball diamonds and a children's play center. Golden died at home of a heart attack on June 17, 1955.

Golden left the Bayside estate to the City of New York as a park "for the use and enjoyment by the young people of the community of all races and creeds in a manner similar to that in which I made this property available for recreation and community acts during my lifetime." The John Golden Park was dedicated on October 18, 1965. Speakers at the ceremony included Mayor Robert F. Wagner, Jr., Robert Moses, Parks Commissioner Newbold Morris, Bernard F. Gimbel (of Gimbels), Frederick O'Neal, Rube Goldberg, Harry Hershfield, and Vincent Sardi Jr. of Sardi's. The John Golden award provides grants to students at the Hunter College Master of Arts in Theatre in New York.

Work

Lyrics
Golden wrote lyrics for many Broadway theatre productions, including:

 Miss Prinnt (Musical, Comedy) December 25, 1900 – November 19, 1901
 The Hoyden (Musical, Comedy) October 19, 1907 – February 1, 1908
 The Candy Shop (Musical, Comedy) April 27, 1909 – June 12, 1909
 Tillie's Nightmare (Musical, Comedy) May 5, 1910 – December 1911
 Girlies (Musical, Comedy) June 13, 1910 – August 27, 1910
 The Echo (Musical) August 17, 1910 – October 1, 1910
 Judy Forgot (Musical, Comedy) October 6, 1910 – November 12, 1910
 Over the River (Musical, Extravaganza, Farce)  January 8, 1912 – April 20, 1912
 The Girl from Montmartre (Play, Farce) August 5, 1912 – April 1913
 A Winsome Widow (Musical, Comedy, Farce) April 11, 1912 – September 7, 1912
 The Sunshine Girl (Musical) February 3, 1913 – September 20, 1913
 A World of Pleasure (Musical, Revue) October 14, 1915 – January 22, 1916
 Sybil (Musical, Comedy) January 10, 1916 – June 3, 1916
 Hip! Hip! Hooray! (1915) (Musical, Revue) September 30, 1915 – June 3, 1916
 Go to It (Musical – music) October 24, 1916 – November 1916
 The Big Show (Musical, Revue, Spectacle) August 31, 1916 – May 5, 1917
 Cheer Up (Musical, Revue) August 23, 1917 – May 11, 1918
 Everything (Musical, Revue, Spectacle) August 22, 1918 – May 17, 1919
 The Midnight Rounders of 1921 (Musical, Revue) February 7, 1921 – April 2, 1921

Songs
Popular songs included:

 "Goodbye Girls, I'm Through"
 "Willie Off the Yacht"
 "I'm Growing Fond of You"
 "Your Heart Looked Into Mine"
 "I Can Dance With Everybody but My Wife"
 "You Can't Play Every Instrument in the Band"

Theater productions
Golden produced many Broadway theatre productions, including:

 Turn To The Right (1916)
 Lightnin' (Play, Comedy) August 26, 1918 – August 27, 1921
 Three Wise Fools (Play, Comedy) October 31, 1918 – August 1919
 Thunder (Play, Comedy) September 22, 1919 – October 1919
 The First Year (Play, Comedy) October 20, 1920 – August 1922
 Dear Me (Play, Comedy) January 17, 1921 – May 1921
 The Wheel (Play, Drama) August 29, 1921 – September 1921
 Thank You (Play, Comedy) October 3, 1921 – May 1922
 A Serpent's Tooth (Play) August 24, 1922 – September 1922
 Spite Corner (Play, Comedy) September 25, 1922 – January 1923
 Seventh Heaven (Play, Comedy) October 30, 1922 – July  1924
 Chicken Feed (Play, Comedy) September 24, 1923 – January 1924
 Pigs (Play, Comedy) September 1, 1924 – June 1925
 A Holy Terror (Play) September 28, 1925 – October 1925
 The Wisdom Tooth (Play, Comedy) February 15, 1926 – July  1926
 Two Girls Wanted (Play, Comedy) September 9, 1926 – June 1927
 The Gossipy Sex (Play, Farce) April 19, 1927 – May 1927
 Four Walls (Play) September 19, 1927 – January 1928
 Eva the Fifth (Play, writer) August 28, 1928 – October 1928
 Night Hostess (Play, Comedy, Drama) September 12, 1928 – December 1928
 Let Us Be Gay (Play, Comedy) February 19, 1929 – December 1929
 Salt Water (Play, Comedy) November 26, 1929 – February 1930
 Joseph (Play, Comedy) February 12, 1930 – February 1930
 Ada Beats the Drum (Play, Comedy) May 8, 1930 – June 1930
 That's Gratitude (Play, Comedy) September 11, 1930 – March 1931
 London Calling (Play, Comedy) October 18, 1930 – October 1930
 As Husbands Go (Play, Comedy) March 5, 1931 – July  1931
 After Tomorrow (Play, Drama) August 26, 1931 – November 1931
 Caught Wet (Play) November 4, 1931 – November 1931
 Savage Rhythm (Play, Drama) December 31, 1931 – January 1932
 Riddle Me This (Play, Comedy) February 25, 1932 – May 1932
 When Ladies Meet (Play, Comedy) October 6, 1932 – March 4, 1933
 When Ladies Meet (Play, Comedy) May 15, 1933 – May 1933
 A Divine Drudge (Play, Drama – writer) October 26, 1933 – November 1933
 No Questions Asked (Play, Comedy) February 5, 1934 – February 1934
 The Bishop Misbehaves (Play, Comedy) February 20, 1935 – June 1935
 A Touch of Brimstone (Play) September 22, 1935 – December 1935
 Tomorrow's a Holiday (Play, Drama) December 30, 1935 – January 1936
 Three Wise Fools (Play, Comedy, Revival) March 1, 1936 – March 1936
 And Now Good-bye (Play, Drama) February 2, 1937 – February 1937
 Susan and God (Play, Comedy) October 7, 1937 – Closing date unknown
 Lightnin' (Play, Comedy, Revival) September 15, 1938 – November 1938
 Skylark (Play, Comedy) October 11, 1939 – May 25, 1940
 The Old Foolishness (Play) December 20, 1940 – December 21, 1940
 Theatre (Play, Comedy) November 12, 1941 – January 10, 1942
 Claudia (Play, Comedy) February 12, 1941 – January 9, 1943
 Counsellor-at-Law (Play, Revival) November 24, 1942 – July 10, 1943
 The Army Play-by Play (producer) June 14, 1943 – September 4, 1943
 Susan and God (Play, Comedy) December 13, 1943 – December 18, 1943
 But Not Goodbye (Play) April 11, 1944 – April 29, 1944
 Three's a Family (Play) May 5, 1943 – July 8, 1944
 A Place of Our Own (Play) April 2, 1945 – April 7, 1945
 Made in Heaven (Play, Comedy) October 24, 1946 – January 11, 1947
 They Knew What They Wanted (Play, Comedy, Revival) February 16, 1949 – April 9, 1949
 The Male Animal (Play, Comedy, Revival) May 15, 1952 – January 31, 1953
 Seventh Heaven (Musical) May 26, 1955 – July 2, 1955

Films
Golden produced the following films:

 The Saphead (1920)
 Thank You (1925)
 Lightnin (1930)
 Those We Love (1932)

Awards
In 1937, he received an honorary degree in Doctor of Public Service from Oglethorpe University.

References
Notes

Citations

Sources

External links

 
 John Golden papers, 1874-1971 (bulk 1925-1954). Held by the Billy Rose Theatre Division, New York Public Library for the Performing Arts
 Collection of visual materials documenting the career of John Golden, 1903-1954. Held by the Billy Rose Theatre Division, New York Public Library for the Performing Arts

1874 births
1955 deaths
American theatre managers and producers
The Lambs presidents
People from Bayside, Queens
People from Wauseon, Ohio